Sahwa may refer to:

Places 
 Sahwa, Rajasthan, a village in India
 al-Sahwah, also called Sahwat al-Qamh, a village in southern Syria

Organizations 
 Sahwa movement, a group of Saudi Salafism
 Sahwa militia, a US-funded Iraqi security force

Historical events 
 aṣ-Ṣaḥwah l-ʾIslāmiyyah, Islamic awakening.
 Sahwa, the literati purges in Joseon Korea.